My Friend Oscar (Swedish: Min vän Oscar) is a 1951 Swedish comedy film directed by Pierre Billon and Åke Ohberg and starring Åke Söderblom, Margareta Fahlén and Olof Winnerstrand. A separate French-language version My Seal and Them was also produced.

It was shot at the Photosonor Studios in Courbevoie on the outskirts of Paris. The film's sets were designed by the art director René Moulaert.

Synopsis
While on a trip to Paris a young Swedish man wins Oscar, a seal, in a raffle who proceeds to cause chaos in his life.

Cast
 Åke Söderblom as Hans Lövgren
 Margareta Fahlén as Gabriella Strandberg
 Olof Winnerstrand as Claes-Herman Sundelius
 Barbro Larsson as Diana Sundelius
 Douglas Håge as Oscar
 Börje Mellvig as 	Stenström
 Sven Lindberg as Zoologist
 Jeanne Fusier-Gir as Lövgren's Housemaid
 Pierre Bertin as UNESCO Director-General
 René Alié as Policeman
 Odette Barencey as Woman 
 Albert Bour as Fish Salesman 
 Gil Delamare as Policeman 
 Raymond Rognoni as Zoo Owner 
 Pierre Sergeol as Restaurant Owner 
 Made Siamé as Fish Seller

References

Bibliography 
 Qvist, Per Olov & von Bagh, Peter. Guide to the Cinema of Sweden and Finland. Greenwood Publishing Group, 2000.

External links 
 

1951 films
Swedish comedy films
1951 comedy films
1950s Swedish-language films
Films directed by Pierre Billon
Films directed by Åke Ohberg
Swedish black-and-white films
Films set in Paris
1950s Swedish films